Fred Dixon may refer to:

 Fred Dixon (politician) (1881–1931), Manitoba politician
 Fred Dixon (athlete) (born 1949), American decathlete

See also
 Frederick Dixon (disambiguation)